{{DISPLAYTITLE:C11H11NO}}
The molecular formula C11H11NO (molar mass: 173.211 g/mol, exact mass: 173.0841 u) may refer to:

 4-Amino-2-methyl-1-naphthol (Vitamin K5)
 4-Amino-3-methyl-1-naphthol (Vitamin K7)